Wattsville is a census-designated place (CDP) in Accomack County, Virginia, United States. It was first listed as a CDP in 2010. As of the 2020 census, it had a population of 1,341.

Geography
It lies at an elevation of 3 feet.

Demographics

2020 census

Note: the US Census treats Hispanic/Latino as an ethnic category. This table excludes Latinos from the racial categories and assigns them to a separate category. Hispanics/Latinos can be of any race.

References

Virginia Trend Report 2: State and Complete Places (Sub-state 2010 Census Data)

Census-designated places in Accomack County, Virginia
Census-designated places in Virginia